France participated in the Eurovision Song Contest 2010 with the song "Allez Ola Olé" written by Hugues Ducamin and Jacques Ballue. The song was performed by Jessy Matador. The French broadcaster France Télévisions in collaboration with the television channel France 3 internally selected the French entry for the 2010 contest in Oslo, Norway. Jessy Matador was officially announced by France 3 as the French entrant on 19 February 2010 and later the song was presented to the public as the contest entry on 20 March 2010.

As a member of the "Big Four", France automatically qualified to compete in the final of the Eurovision Song Contest. Performing in position 18, France placed twelfth out of the 25 participating countries with 82 points.

Background 

France first won the contest in 1958 with "Dors, mon amour" performed by André Claveau. In the 1960s, they won three times, with "Tom Pillibi" performed by Jacqueline Boyer in 1960, "Un premier amour" performed by Isabelle Aubret in 1962 and "Un jour, un enfant" performed by Frida Boccara, who won in 1969 in a four-way tie with the Netherlands, Spain and the United Kingdom. France's fifth victory came in 1977, when Marie Myriam won with the song "L'oiseau et l'enfant". France have also finished second four times, with Paule Desjardins in 1957, Catherine Ferry in 1976, Joëlle Ursull in 1990 and Amina in 1991, who lost out to Sweden's Carola in a tie-break. In the 21st century, France has had less success, only making the top ten three times, with Natasha St-Pier finishing fourth in 2001, Sandrine François finishing fifth in 2002 and Patricia Kaas finishing eighth in 2009.

The French national broadcaster, France Télévisions, broadcasts the event within France and delegates the selection of the nation's entry to the television channel France 3. France 3 confirmed that France would participate in the 2010 Eurovision Song Contest on 20 November 2009. The French broadcaster had used both national finals and internal selection to choose the French entry in the past. The French entries from 2005 to 2007 were selected via a national final that featured several competing acts. In 2008 and 2009, the broadcaster opted to internally select the French entry, a procedure that was continued in order to select the 2010 entry.

Before Eurovision

Internal selection 
France 3 announced in late 2009 that the French entry for the 2010 Eurovision Song Contest would be selected internally. On 19 February 2010, France 2 entertainment director Nicolas Pernikoff confirmed that the French entrant for the Eurovision Song Contest 2010 would be Congolese singer Jessy Matador. Information that Matador would represent France at the Eurovision Song Contest 2010 was leaked on 17 January 2010 during the Europe 1 talk show programme Le Grand Direct, hosted by Jean-Marc Morandini. The broadcaster considered two artists, Emmanuel Moire and Jessy Matador, before finalising their decision internally.

Jessy Matador's song "Allez Ola Olé", which featured a reference to the 1998 FIFA World Cup album Music of the World Cup: Allez! Ola! Ole! due to the French broadcaster hoping to create a song to promote the 2010 FIFA World Cup, was written by Hugues Ducamin and Jacques Ballue, and was previewed on 19 March 2010 online via the website chartsinfrance.net. The full song was released on 20 March 2010.

Controversy 
Following the selection of Jessy Matador as the French entrant, French Eurovision fans complained that France Télévisions sacrifices Eurovision for the name of promoting other events "which should not be allowed from a public channel", and that the broadcaster were not willing to win the contest. France Télévisions consequently issued a statement on 16 March 2010 stating that the song in combination with Matador's stage presence would "make it possible for France to glow on the Eurovision stage". Following the release of "Allez Ola Olé" on 20 March 2010, the song received positive feedback with the public believing it would be singled out for its festive and upbeat nature in a ballad-dominant year.

At Eurovision

According to Eurovision rules, all nations with the exceptions of the host country and the "Big Four" (France, Germany, Spain and the United Kingdom) are required to qualify from one of two semi-finals in order to compete for the final; the top ten countries from each semi-final progress to the final. As a member of the "Big 4", France automatically qualified to compete in the final on 29 May 2010. In addition to their participation in the final, France is also required to broadcast and vote in one of the two semi-finals. During the semi-final allocation draw on 7 February 2010, France was assigned to broadcast and vote in the second semi-final on 27 May 2010. The EBU's Reference Group later approved a request by the French broadcaster for France to broadcast and vote in the first semi-final on 27 May 2010 instead due to scheduling problems.

In France, the first semi-final was broadcast live on France 4 with commentary by Peggy Olmi and Yann Renoard with the second semi-final broadcast on France 4 via a tape delay, while the final was broadcast live on France 3 with commentary by Cyril Hanouna and Stéphane Bern. The French spokesperson, who announced the French votes during the final, was Audrey Chauveau.

Final 
Jessy Matador took part in technical rehearsals on 22 and 23 May, followed by dress rehearsals on 28 and 29 May. This included the jury final on 28 May where the professional juries of each country watched and voted on the competing entries. The running order for the semi-finals and final was decided through another draw on 23 March 2010 and France was subsequently placed to perform in position 18, following the entry from Ukraine and before the entry from Romania.

The French performance featured Jessy Matador on stage wearing a white waistcoat and grey trousers and performing a choreographed routine with five backing performers, including three dancers and two backing vocalists: Nedjim Mahtallah and Jessie Fasano. During the performance, Matador made use of the stage catwalk and together with the backing performers concluded the performance by performing a tribal chant. The stage colours were predominately yellow with blue and gold lighting which displayed the word "Allez". The performance also featured smoke, pyrotechnic and flame effects. France placed twelfth in the final, scoring 82 points.

Voting 
Voting during the three shows consisted of 50 percent public televoting and 50 percent from a jury deliberation. The jury consisted of five music industry professionals who were citizens of the country they represent. This jury was asked to judge each contestant based on: vocal capacity; the stage performance; the song's composition and originality; and the overall impression by the act. In addition, no member of a national jury could be related in any way to any of the competing acts in such a way that they cannot vote impartially and independently.

Following the release of the full split voting by the EBU after the conclusion of the competition, it was revealed that France had placed eighth with the public televote and twenty-second with the jury vote. In the public vote, France scored 151 points and in the jury vote the nation scored 34 points.

Below is a breakdown of points awarded to France and awarded by France in the first semi-final and grand final of the contest, and the breakdown of the jury voting and televoting conducted during the two shows:

Points awarded to France

Points awarded by France

References

External links
 Huffington Post Analysis

2010
Countries in the Eurovision Song Contest 2010
Eurovision
Eurovision